Maison (French for "house") may refer to:

People
 Edna Maison (1892–1946), American silent-film actress
 Jérémy Maison (born 1993), French cyclist
 Leonard Maison, New York state senator 1834–1837
 Nicolas Joseph Maison (1771–1840), Marshal of France and Minister of War
 René Maison (1895–1962), Belgian operatic tenor
 Rudolf Maison (1854–1904), German sculptor
 Maison-Feyne, a commune in the Creuse department, Nouvelle-Aquitaine
 Maison-Maugis, a former commune in the Orne department, Normandy
 Maison-Ponthieu
 Maison-Roland, a commune in the Somme department, Hauts-de-France
 Maison-Rouge, a commune in the Seine-et-Marne department, Île-de-France

Music

Songs
 "Maison", by Dreamcatcher from Apocalypse: Save Us

See also 
 Valérie Grand'Maison (born 1988), Canadian Paralympic swimmer
 Zoé De Grand Maison (born 1995), Canadian actress
 Maisons (disambiguation)
 Mason (disambiguation)